This is a list of soccer clubs in Marshall Islands.

Calvary I
Calvary II
Duff's
Hogan's Heroes
Kobeer
Lady Doves 
Locals   
Majuro All-Stars
Play On
Papules
Purple People Eaters
Queen Of Peace
Shamrock Rovers
Slow Motion
Spartans I  
Spartans II 
Spartan Blues
Spartans Red
Spartans White
Star Motion
FC Swell

References

External links
List of Marshall Islands champions

Marshall Islands
Soccer in the Marshall Islands
Soccer clubs
Soccer clubs